"Starting All Over Again" is a 1972 song by the cousin duo Mel & Tim. It is the title track of their second LP. It was their second and final top 40 hit in the U.S. and Canada. It peaked at number 19 on the Billboard Hot 100, spending five months on the American charts. On the R&B chart, the song peaked at number 4.

The cousins performed "Starting All Over Again" on Soul Train on March 17, 1973.  They appeared on the show along with  Al Green.

Chart history

Weekly charts
Mel and Tim

Hall & Oates version
"Starting All Over Again" was covered by American duo Hall & Oates in 1990 on the album Change of Season. Released as a single in 1991, their version reached number 11 on the Canadian Adult Contemporary chart and number 10 on the U.S. Adult Contemporary chart during summer of that year.

Charts

Year-end charts

Other versions
 Bobby Bland, in 1992.
 Israel "Iz" Kamakawiwo'ole, on the final album before his death, N Dis Life, released in 1996.
 "Starting All Over Again" was the title track of Paul Jones' 2009 album and it featured Eric Clapton on guitar.

References

External links
 
 

1972 songs
1972 singles
Stax Records singles
Arista Records singles
1991 singles
Hall & Oates songs
Mel & Tim songs